Somatina transvehens is a moth of the  family Geometridae. It is found in China (Hainan).

References

Moths described in 1918
Endemic fauna of Hainan
Scopulini